Adolph Scherrer (1847-1925) was an American architect. He designed the 1888 Indiana State Capitol building, the Tipton County Courthouse, and Tipton County Jail and Sheriff's Home. He also designed Maennerchor Hall and the gateway and waiting station to Crown Hill Cemetery. The site of his home is now a parking lot.

References

External links

Architects from Indianapolis
1847 births
1925 deaths